The following is a list of Macedonians.

Ancient
See List of ancient Macedonians.

Roman
Also see Macedonia (Roman province)#Citizens

 Sopater, (Veria 1st century BC), saint, accompanied with Paulos
 Antipater of Thessalonica (late 1st century BC), epigrammatic poet and governor of the city
 Philippus of Thessalonica (late 1st century AD), epigrammatic poet and compiler of the Greek Anthology
 Saint Hermes, (Thessaloniki, Rome 120 AD)
 Martyr Theodora (Thessaloniki, Rome 123 AD)
 Athryilatus of Thasos (1–2nd century AD), physician
 Agape, Chionia, and Irene (died 304), saints
 Saint Demetrius, early 4th century

Byzantine

Rulers
 Basil I the Macedonian (811–886, ruled 867–886), founder of the Macedonian dynasty, born in Macedonia (theme)
 Nikephoros Bryennios (1062–1137), general, statesman, historian
 Michael and Andreas Palaiologos (1342–1350), leaders of the Zealots' regime of Thessalonica
 Andronikos Palaiologos, despot of Thessalonike (1408–1423)

Clerics
 Paul I of Constantinople Ecumenical Patriarch (337–339)
 Demophilus of Constantinople Ecumenical Patriarch (370–380)
 Saint Methodius (826–885), main translator of the Bible into Old Church Slavonic
 Saint Cyril (827–869), creator of the Glagolitic alphabet, Christianized the Slavs
 Philotheus Kokkinos (1300–1379), ecumenical patriarch
 Matthew Blastares (c. 1290–1360), monk, canonist
 Nilus Cabasilas  (1298–1363), theologian
 Nicholas Cabasilas (c. 1319–1391), mystic theologian
 Macarius Macres (1382–1431), theologian
 Isidore of Kiev, Thessaloniki, Metropolitan of Kiev (1433–1458), ecumenical patriarch (1450–53)

Scholars
 Stobaeus (5th century), anthologist of Greek authors
 Macedonius of Thessalonica (the Consul) (6th century), epigrammatist of Greek Anthology
 John Kaminiates (904), historian on the sack of Thessalonica by the Saracens
 Theodora of Arta, (Servia 1210, Arta 1280)
 Demetrius Triclinius (c. 1300), philologist, astronomer
 Thomas Magister (c. 1275–1325), philologist
 Gregory Acindynus (1300–1348), theologian
 Demetrius Cydones (1324–1397), scholastic theologian
 Prochorus Cydones (1330–1369), scholastic theologian
 Nikephoros Choumnos (c. 1250–1327), official, scholar and physicist
 Konstantinos Armenopoulos (1320–c. 1385), jurist
 John Anagnostes (1430), historian on the capture of Thessalonica by the Ottomans
 Theodorus Gaza (c. 1400–1475), Renaissance humanist and translator of Aristotle
 Mazaris, (15th century), writer from Thessaloniki
 Georgios Kontaris (17th century), philosopher and historian from Servia

Artists
 Manuel Panselinos, painter, iconographer of Macedonian Renaissance
 George Kallierges, painter
 Michael Astrapas and Eutychios, iconographers
 John Staurakios, hagiographer

Early Modern

Scholars
 Andronikos Kallistos (1400–1486), teacher of Greek literature in Bologna, Rome, Florence, Paris and London
 Ioannis Kottounios (1572–1657), founder the Kottounian Hellinomouseio
 Konstantinos Kallokratos (born 1589), teacher and poet
 Kallinikos Manios (1624–1665), founder of the first school in Veroia
 Georgios Parakeimenos, director of Kozani's school, physician and preacher
 Sevastos Leontiadis (1690–1765), director of Kastoria's school
 Michail Papageorgiou (1727–1796), taught in his birthplace, Selitsa (today Eratyra), Meleniko, Vienna and Budapest
 Dimitrios Karakasis (1734–?), physician in Vienna, Larisa, Siatista, Kozani, Bucharest
 Manassis Iliadis (early 18th century – 1785), born in Meleniko; taught philosophy and physics at the Bucharest Academy
 Konstantinos Michail, philosopher, physician and linguist
 Dimitrios Darvaris (1754–1823), born in Kleisoura, Kastoria, publisher of a Greek grammar
 Charissios Megdanis (1768–1823), born in Kozani, priest, doctor, writer
 Georgios Sakellarios (1765–1838), chief physician at the court of Ali Pasha
 Michail Perdikaris (1766–1828), born in Kozani, physician and scholar
 Athanasios Christopoulos (1772–1847), poet, scholar and "spokesman for foreign cases" in Wallachia
 Efronios Raphael Papagiannoussi Popovits (1774–1853), born in Kozani, Scholar and Benefactor (among others: the Charta of Rigas)
 Grigorios Zalykis (1777–1820), Thessaloniki, writer, founder of "Ellenoglosson Xenodochion"
 Georgios Rousiadis (1783–1854), born in Kozani, teacher in the Greek community of Vienna and Pest; took part in the Greek War of Independence
 Minas Minoidis, born in Edessa, taught Ancient Greek language and literature in Paris
 Athanasios Stageiritis from Stagira, professor of Greek language at the Royal Academy in Vienna, publisher of the fortnightly literary journal "Kalliope" in Vienna from 1819 to 1821
 Theodoros Manousis (1793–1858), historian, judge, benefactor and archaeologist from Siatista
 Anastasios Michail, member of Berlin's Academy of Sciences
 Georgios Lassanis (1793–1870), scholar and politician
 Nicholaos Dragoumis (1809–1879), politician and writer from Kastoria regional unit
 Markides Pouliou, brothers from Siatista, published the first Greek newspaper Ephemeris in Vienna in 1791
 Ioannis Pantazidis from Krusevo (1821–1900), professor in University of Athens in Greek literature
 Margaritis Dimitsas (1829–1903), writer from Achrida
 Sophocles Garbolas (1833–1911), writer, journalist; he published in 1875 the first Greek newspapers in Thessalonica, Ermis (Hermes) and Pharos tis Makedonias (Lighthouse of Macedonia)
 Theodoros Natsinas (1872–1949), scholar and director of school (Maraslion of Thessaloniki)

Benefactors
 Georg Johannes Karajanis (fl. c. 1750), born in Kozani, merchant, great-great-grandfather of Herbert von Karajan
 Stergios Doumpas (1794–1870), born in Vlasti, merchant, patron of arts
 Nikolaos Doumpas (1830–1900), from Vlasti, patron of arts, politician, founder of the first interteaching Greek school in Vienna
 Demetrius Vikelas (1835–1908), the first president of the International Olympic Committee (IOC)
 Calliope Tatti (1894–1978), philanthropist
 Ioannis Papafis, (1792–1886), Thessaloniki, funded the Greek War of Independence
 Ioannis Trampatzis, (1813–1890), Siatista, merchant

Explorers
 Evstratios Delarov, (1740–1806), one of the first explorers of Alaska

Clerics
 Patriarch Isidore I of Constantinople Ecumenical Patriarch of Constantinople (1347–1349)
 Patriarch Philotheus I of Constantinople Ecumenical Patriarch of Constantinople (1354–1376)
 Patriarch Nephon I of Constantinople Ecumenical Patriarch of Constantinople (1311–1315)
 Damaskinos (Stouditis) (died 1577), patriarchal exarch of Aetolia
 Mitrofanis Kritopoulos (1589–1639), Patriarch of Alexandria
 Chrysanthos (1768–1834), born in Edessa, metropolitan bishop of Serres, Ecumenical Patriarch of Constantinople
 Patriarch Joachim III of Constantinople (1834–1912)
 Patriarch Callinicus of Alexandria, Konstantinos Kyparissis, (Skotina, Pieria 1800 – Mytilini 1889)
 Patriarch Neophytus VIII of Constantinople Ecumenical Patriarch (1891–1894)

Revolutionaries

Greek War of Independence (1821 and before)
 Dionysius the Philosopher Ekonomikos, (1540–1611), with origin from Avdella, Grevena regional unit, Bishop, revolutionary in 1611
 Zisis Karadimos (died 1705)
 Panagiotis Zidros (1630–1750), from Grevena
 Georgios Papazolis (1725–1775), born in Siatista, leader of Orlov Revolt in 1770, officer of Russian army
 Apostolos "Tolios" Lazos (Milia, Pieria, born 1770), son of Gero-Lazos
 Nikolaos Tsaras (Nikotsaras), (Olympos 1774 – Litochoro 1807)
 Theoharis Tourountzias (1776–1798), born in Siatista, co-martyr of Rigas Feraios
 Ioannis Emmanouel (1774–1798), born in Kastoria, co-martyr of Rigas Feraios
 Ioannis Pharmakis (1772–1821) Greek War of Independence
 Ioannis Ziakas, Grevena (1795–1826), son of Gero-Ziakas
 Anastassios Chimeftos, (Kassandra – died 1821)
 Apostolos Kotas, (Chalkidiki – Psara 1824), Greek War of Independence
 Giorgakis Olympios (1772–1821)
 Anastassios Voulgaris (died 1839), Greek revolutionary from Malessi, Greek War of Independence
 Vassilios Romfeis (1773 – after 1804), Naousa, Imathia, Greek War of Independence
 Stamatios Kapsas (Capetan Chapsas), (Kryopigi Kassandras – Vasilika 1821)
 Zafeirakis Theodosiou, (died 1822)
 Diamantis Nikolaou, Fteri, Pieria (1790–1856), Greek War of Independence
 Vassilios Athanassiou, (Riza, Chalkidiki – died 1828)
 Anastasios Karatasos (1764–1830)
 Aggelis Gatsos (1771–1839)
 Georgios Asteriou, (Varvara, Chalkidiki – Atalanti 1847)
 Emmanouel Pappas (1772–1821)
 Nikolaos Tsamis, Edessa, Greek War of Independence, creator of the first official Greek flag
 Mavroudis Papageorgakis (Polygyros – Atalanti 1847)
 Markos Dragoumis (1770–1854), born in Vogatsiko, Kastoria regional unit
 Konstantinos Doumpiotis, (Doumpia, Chalkidiki 1793 – Chalkida 1865)
 Nikolaos Kasomoulis (1795–1872), born in Siatista, member of Filiki Eteria
 Andronikos Paikos (Thessaloniki 1796 – Athina 1879)

Northern Greece revolts (1854 and 1878)
 Anastasios Pichion (1836–1913), born in Ohrid
 Dimitrios Karatasos (1798–1861)
 Athanassios Asteriou, (Livadi, Olympos 1850–after 1878), Revolution of 1878
 Leonidas Voulgaris, (1822–after 1878), from Malessi, Revolution of 1854 and 1878
 Theodoros Ziakas, Grevena (1798–1882), brother of Ioannis Ziakas, Revolution of 1854 and 1878
 Kosmas Doumpiotis, from Nikiti, Chalkidiki, (1826–1922), Revolution of 1878
 Argyrios Vouzas (1857–?), born in Kastoria

Macedonian Struggle (1903 to 1908)
 Iraklis Patikas, born in Vasilika, Thessaloniki
 Georgios Pentzikis, born in Thessaloniki
 Georgios Savvas, born in Thessaloniki
 Lazaros Tsamis (1878–1933), born in Pisoderi
 Ioannis Simanikas, born in Naousa, Imathia
 Michael Sionidis (1870–1935), born in Grčište, close to Bogdanci
 Dimitrios Stagas, born in Kleisoura, Kastoria
 Athanasios Stavroudis (1873–), born in Melissochori, Thessaloniki 
 Georgios Thomopoulos (1866–1952), born in Ritini
 Dimitrios Tsitsimis, born in Strumica
 Ioannis Ramnalis (1885–1923), born in Isoma, near Kilkis
 Stergios Vlachveis (1880–1948), born in Irakleia, Serres
 Zisis Vrakas (1857–), born in Perivoli, Grevena
 Christos Dogiamas (1880–), born in Kastaneri, Paionia
 Doukas Gaitatzis (1879–1938), born in Serres
 Georgios Seridis, born in Flampouro, Florina
 Pavlos Rakovitis (1877–1907), born in Kratero
 Pavlos Kyrou (–1906), born in Antartiko
 Georgios Doitsinis, born in Evzonoi
 Traianos Liantzakis, born in Antartiko
 Christos Stogiannidis (1884–), born in Arnissa
 Georgios Karaiskakis (–1910), born in Bogdanci
 Periklis Drakos, born in Kavala
 Dimitrios Golnas (–1908), born in Nymfaio
 Charalambos Boufidis and Pantelis Papaioannou (–1907), born in Kolešino
 Antigonos Choleris (–1913), born in Vevi
 Petros Christou (1887–1908), born in Velušina
 Stergios Daoutis (–1973), born in Ano Seli, Imathia
 Konstantinos Papastavrou, born in Mavrochori
 Evangelos Natsis (1876–1904), born in Asprogeia, Florina
 Stergios Goutas (–1913), born in Mesolouri
 Georgios Giotas (1880–1911), born in Giannitsa
 Dimitrios Tsapanos (1882/1883–), born in Magarevo
 Ioannis Martzios, born in Kali Vrysi, Drama
 Nikolaos Manos, born in Drosopigi, Florina
 Evangelos Koukoudeas, born in Strumica
 Georgios Modis (1887–1975), born in Monastiri
 Theodoros Adam, born in Nižepole
 Stephanos Dragoumis (1842–1923), founder of the Macedonian Committee in 1904, origined from Vogatsiko
 Ion Dragoumis (1878–1920), son of the previous
 Konstantinos Christou, Kapetan Kottas, (1863–1905)
 Evangelos Natsis (1876–1904), born in Asprogia, Florina regional unit
 Antonios Zois (–1946), born in Monastiri
 Armen Kouptsios (1880–1905), born in Volakas, Drama regional unit

Other famous
 George Zorbas (Katafygion Kolindrou, Pieria 1867 – Skopje 1942), Zorba the Greek, protagonist (fictionalized) of the novel by Nikos Kazantzakis
 Alexandros Natsinas, Lt General, the creator and first director (1953–63) of the Greek Central Intelligence Service.
 Ioannis Skandalidis (Salonica c. 1775 – 1826), politician and secretary

Contemporary

Architects
 Stamatis Kleanthes (1802–1862)
 Lysandros Kaftantzoglou (1811–1885)
 Aristotelis Zachos (1871–1939)
 Alexander Dragoumis (1891–1977)

Athletes
Greek-Macedonian-Australian * Mark Philippoussis – tennis player

Archery
 Evangelia Psarra (born 1974)
 Fotini Vavatsi (born 1974)
 Elpida Romantzi (born 1981)

Basketball
 Giannis Ioannidis (born 1945) (coach also)
 Nikos Filippou (born 1962)
 Panagiotis Fasoulas (born 1963)
 Eleftherios Kakiousis (born 1968)
 Nikos Oikonomou (born 1973)
 Nikos Hatzivrettas (born 1977)
 Kostas Tsartsaris  (born 1979)
 Dimitris Diamantidis (born 1980)
 Nikos Zisis (born 1983)
 Sofoklis Schortsanitis (born 1985)

Chess
 Hristos Banikas (born 1978)

Cycling
 Kleanthis Bargas (born 1978)

Football
 Nikolaos Aggelakis (born 1906)
 Kleanthis Vikelides  (born 1916)
 Giannis Kanakis (born 1927)
 Alketas Panagoulias (born 1934) (coach also)
 Giorgos Koudas (born 1946)
 Georgios Paraschos (born 1952) (coach also)
 Giorgos Foiros (born 1953) (coach also)
 Dinos Kouis (born 1955)
 Yiorgos Kostikos (born 1958)
 Nikos Karageorgiou (born 1962) (coach also)
 Nikos Nioplias (born 1965) (coach also)
 Dimitris Markos (born 1971)
 Theodoros Zagorakis (born 1971), captain of the 2004 Greece national football team and president of PAOK FC
 Vassilios Tsiartas (born 1972), member of the 2004 Greece national football team
 Alexis Alexoudis  (born 1972)
 Zisis Vryzas (born 1973), member of the 2004 Greece national football team
 Nikos Dabizas (born 1973)
 Georgios Anatolakis (born 1974)
 Petros Passalis (born 1974)
 Traianos Dellas (born January 31, 1976), he scored the only goal of the semi-final game in UEFA Euro 2004
 Vassilis Lakis  (born 1976)
 Pantelis Kafes (born 1978)
 Angelos Charisteas (born February 9, 1980), he scored the only goal of the final game of the UEFA Euro 2004
 Charilaos Pappas (born 1983)
 Panagiotis Lagos (born 1985)
 Dimitrios Salpingidis (born 1981)

Handball
 Dimitris Tzimourtos (born 1981)

Track and field
 Georgios Roubanis (born 1929), pole vault, Bronze Olympic Medalist Melbourne 1956
 Vassilios Papageorgopoulos (born 1947), sprinter and  mayor of Thessaloniki
 Anna Verouli (born 1957), javelin thrower, Golden Medalist, European Championship 1982
 Konstantinos Koukodimos (born 1969), long jumper, politician, MP

Volleyball
 Kostas Christofidelis (born 1977)

Weightlifting
 Giannis Tsintsaris (born 1962)

Wrestling
 Apostolos Taskoudis (born 1985)

Presidents of Greece
 Constantine Karamanlis (March 8, 1907 – April 23, 1998), former President and Prime Minister of Greece
 Christos Sartzetakis (born in Thessaloniki, April 6, 1929), origin from Sklithro, Florina

Prime Ministers of Greece
 Stephanos Dragoumis (1842–1923), Prime Minister of Greece (January 10, 1910 – October 6, 1910)
 Evripidis Bakirtzis (1895–1947), first president of Political Committee of National Liberation, during World War II
 Alexandros Svolos (1892–1956), second president of the Political Committee of National Liberation, during World War II
 Constantine Karamanlis (March 8, 1907 – April 23, 1998), former President and Prime Minister of Greece
 Kostas Karamanlis (born September 14, 1956), (nephew of Constantine) former Prime Minister of Greece

Presidents of Greek parliament
 Constantine Ractivand (1865–1935), from Veria
 Philippos Petsalnikos (born 1950), from Mavrochori, Kastoria regional unit

Politicians
 Anastasios Polyzoidis, Meleniko (1802–1873)
 Philip Dragoumis (1890–1980)
 Alexandros Zannas (1892–1968)
 Michail Sapkas (1873–1956), born in Magarevo
 Markos E. Bolaris (born 1958), ex-Assistant Minister of National Economy, member of the Greek Parliament (Panhellenic Socialist Movement), representing Serres
 Theofylaktos Papakonstantinou, (1905–1991, Monastiri), journalist, minister of Education and Religious Affairs
 Nikolaos Martis (born 1915)
 Traianos Nallis (born 1874 Gradešnica), member of the first Ottoman Parliament Second Constitutional Era (Ottoman Empire) 1908
 Dr. Stavros Nallis, first president of Makedoniki Amina established in Monastiri (1903)
 Markos Natsinas (born 1925)
 Stefanos Natsinas (born 1910)
 Anastasios Dalipis (1896–1949), politician and army officer, from a village of Kastoria
 Dimitrios Makris (1910–1981), MP for Florina and Interior Minister for Greece
 Stelios Papathemelis (born 1938)
 Georgios Lianis (born 1942), ex-Minister of Sports and journalist
 Giannis Ioannidis (born 1945), basketball player, coach, politician and minister of sports
 Vassilios Papageorgopoulos (born 1947), sprinter and  mayor of Thessaloniki
 Georgios Orfanos (born 1953), ex-Minister of Sports and ex-football-player
 Georgios Papastamkos (born 1955)
 Evangelos Venizelos (born 1957)
 Panagiotis Fasoulas (born 1963), basketball player, politician, mayor of Piraeus
 Eva Kaili (born 1976), member of the European Parliament and news broadcaster
 Elena Rapti
 Liana Gouta chemical engineer, politician and first driver of bio-car in Greece
 Ioannis Gklavakis, member of the European Parliament

First Ladies
 Dimitra Liani (born 1955), wife of Andreas Papandreou
 Natasa Pazaïti (born 1966), wife of Kostas Karamanlis

Journalists
 Ioannis Vellidis, founder of Makedonia (newspaper) in 1911
 Nikolaos Mertzos (born 1936), founder of the magazine Makedoniki Zoi (Macedonian Life) in 1966
 Kostas Bliatkas (born 1957)
 Vicky Hadjivassiliou
 Rania Thraskia

Writers
 Zoi Karelli (1901–1998)
 Georgios Vafopoulos (1903–1996), born in Gevgeli, now in the Republic of Macedonia
 Dimitrios St. Dimou (1904–1990)
 Pavlos Papasiopis  (1906–1977)
 Nikos Gabriel Pentzikis (1908–1993)
 Anthoula Stathopoulou (1909–1935)
 George Stogiannidis (1912–1994)
 Anthos Philitas (1920–1997)
 Kleitos Kyrou (1921–2006)
 Panos Thasitis (born 1923)
 Yorgos Ioannou (1927–1985)
 Nikos Bakolas (1927–1999)
 Dinos Christianopoulos (born 1931)
 Nikos Alexis Aslanoglou (1931–1996)
 Markos Meskos (born 1935)
 Vassilis Vassilikos (born 1934)
 Giorgos Chimonas (1936 or 1939–2000)
 Anestis Evangelou (1937–1994)
 Kostas Zouraris (born 1940)
 Demetris Th. Gotsis (born 1945)
 Nasos Vagenas (born 1945)

Actors
 Kostas Voutsas (born 1931)
 Zoe Laskari (born 1942)
 Katia Dandoulaki (born 1948)
 Dimitris Starovas (born 1963)
 Antonis Kanakis (born 1965) comedian
 Alekos Sissovitis (born 1965)
 Mary Akrivopoulou (born 1975)
 Nadia Tass, director and actress from Florina

Filmmakers
 Maria Plyta (1915–2006):el:Μαρία Πλυτά, the first Greek woman film-maker
 Nikos Vezyrgiannis (born 1964)
 Zahos Samoladas (born 1967)
 Patrick Tatopoulos, Greek-American movie production designer

Scientists
 Achilles Papapetrou (1907–1997), theoretical physicist
 Antonis Volanis (born 1948), industrial designer
 Dr. Kostas Kosmatopoulos (born 1950) bio-researcher
 Markos Papageorgiou (born 1953) electrical engineer
 Maria Spiropulu (born 1970), experimental physicist at CERN
 Sotiris Malassiotis (born 1971) researcher in informatics & telematics
 John Hadjidemetriou (born 1937) astrophysicist
 Kostas E. Psannis (born 1974) computer engineer
 Panagiotis Spyrou, heart surgeon
 Dimitrios Maronitis, classical scholar
 Evangelos Kofos, historian
 A.Phivos  Christidis (1946–2004) linguist

Entrepreneurs
 Ioannis Boutaris (politician also)

Singers
 Stella Haskil (1918–1954)
 Marinella (born 1935)
 Stratos Dionysiou, (1935–1990)
 Manolis Mitsias (born 1946)
 Paschalis Terzis (born 1949)
 Kostas Makedonas (born 1967)
 Lizeta Kalimeri (born 1969)
 Despina Vandi (born July 22, 1969)
 Melina Kana
 Dionysia-Niovi Klavdianou, soprano
 Konstantinos Katsaras, (opera singer, born 1975) 
 Petros Gaitanos, :tr:Petros Gaitanos
 Kalliopi Vetta
 Eleni Peta
 Eleana Papaioannou (born 1983)
 Vassy, origin from Florina

Musicians
 Dimitrios Lalas (1844–1911), born in Magarevo, pianist, composer
 Emilios Riadis (1880–1935), pianist, composer
 Dimitrios Semsis (1883–1950), alias Salonikios, born in Stromnitsa
 Dionysis Savvopoulos (born December 2, 1944), composer, lyricist and singer
 Argyris Bakirtzis (born 1947)
 Nikolas Asimos (1949–1988), counter-culture rock artist
 Nikos Ziogalas (born 1953)
 Sokratis Malamas (born 1957)
 Giannis Aggelakas, (born 1959), singer and leader of rock band Trypes
 Marianthi and Sophie, founders of synthopop band Marsheaux
 Zak Stefanou (born 1984)

Models
 Mara Darmousli (born 1981)
 Marietta Chrousala (born 1983)

References

 
Greek
Greek